Pieter Christoffel Wonder (10 January 1780 – 12 July 1852) was a Dutch painter, active in England.

Biography
Wonder was born in Utrecht. He was largely self-taught, by making copies of the Old Masters, although between 1802 and 1804 he did attend classes at the Kunstakademie Düsseldorf. In 1807 he established the "" (Love of Art Society) in Utrecht together with other artists including Jan Kobell, and served as director.

From 1823 to 1831, he worked in England, where he became well known as a portrait painter, but also painted some interior scenes and copies of works by Raphael. Wonder died in 1852 in Amsterdam.

References

External links

1780 births
1852 deaths
19th-century Dutch painters
Dutch male painters
Dutch portrait painters
Artists from Utrecht
19th-century Dutch male artists